The Kortenberg building is an office building of the European Union (EU) in Brussels, Belgium. It houses mostly bodies related to the Common Security and Defence Policy (CSDP).

History
The building was constructed in 1977 for an insurance company. That use of the building started after the establishment of the European Security and Defence Policy (ESDP), the precursor of the Common Security and Defence Policy, in the early 2000s under the auspices of High Representative Javier Solana, who stated on several occasions the need to build a "strong in-house strategic culture". 

Most of the newly-established European External Action Service (EEAS) has been in the Triangle building, at the Robert Schuman Roundabout, since 2012, but for security reasons, CSDP departments have been unable to move to the building, which is 500 m away.

Architecture
The postmodern L-shaped building was designed the architectural firm ARCHI + I and is located at the corner of rue Le Titien. Towards avenue de Cortenbergh, there are eight floors, the last of which is set back; towards rue Le Titien, four floors are surmounted by the glass roof of the auditorium. Windows with aluminum frames forming a glass base on the first two levels; then going up level by level in a staircase to reach the top of the building on the rue Le Titien side; the glass roof then describes a slope up to the height of the neighboring houses. The rest of the facades is in red Indian granite: granite of the base and the blind bay towards rue Le Titien unpolished; disc patterns under the unpolished windows also. Entrance of modest size between two colossal stainless steel columns rising to the full height of the building and appearing to cross the granite blocks. Rear facade alternating bands of red and brown bricks.

The interior consists of modest offices around central corridors and an indoor garden.

CSDP tenants
Part of the European External Action Service (EEAS):
European Union Military Staff (EUMS), including its Military Planning and Conduct Capability (MPCC)
Civilian Planning and Conduct Capability (CPCC)
Joint Support Coordination Cell (JSCC)
Crisis Management and Planning Directorate (CMPD)

CSDP agencies outside the EEAS:
European Defence Agency (EDA)
European Union Satellite Centre (SatCen)

The MPCC, the JSCC and the CPCC together form the permanent military and civilian strategic level facilities in the EU command-and-control structure.

See also
 Triangle building, the nearby main seat of the European External Action Service
 Brussels and the European Union

References

External links
The European Union and Military Force: Governance and Strategy

Military of the European Union
European quarter of Brussels
Buildings of the European External Action Service
Buildings and structures in Brussels